Jean-Marc Mwema (born 5 December 1989) is a Belgian-Congolese professional basketball player for Telenet Giants Antwerp of the BNXT League. He also represents the Belgian national basketball team.

Professional career
Mwema played a long time for Antwerp Giants, as he played in Antwerp from 2009 until 2016. In the 2011–12 season, Mwema was named the BLB Most Promising Player.

In December 2016, Mwema signed a contract with Telenet Oostende. On 19 February 2017, marked the first time Mwema won a title with his team when he won the Belgian Cup. Mwema signed a one-year extension with the team on July 28, 2020. In his five seasons with Oostende, he won the Pro Basketball League (PBL) five consecutive times.

On 5 August 2021, Mwema returned to Antwerp Giants for a second stint, signing a contract for three seasons. On 12 March 2023, Mwema and the Giants won the Belgian Cup after beating BC Oostende in the final.

International career
He represented Belgium at the EuroBasket 2015, where the team was eliminated in the Round of 16 after a 75–54 loss to Greece.

Honours
Oostende
Pro Basketball League: 2017, 2018, 2019, 2020, 2021
Belgian Cup: 2017, 2018, 2021
Individual
PBL Most Promising Player: 2012

References

External links
Profile at Eurobasket.com

1989 births
Living people
Antwerp Giants players
BC Oostende players
Belgian men's basketball players
Belgium national basketball players
People from Merksem
Power forwards (basketball)
Small forwards
Ugandan men's basketball players